Dialectica pyramidota is a moth of the family Gracillariidae. It is known from South Africa and Réunion.

The larvae feed on Ehretia rigida. They probably mine the leaves of their host plant.

References

Dialectica (moth)
Moths of Africa
Moths described in 1918